Guy Allen 'Sudden Sam' Ermolenko (born November 23, 1960 Maywood, California) is a former speedway rider. In 1993 he won the  Speedway World Championship in Pocking, Germany. He is the older brother of Charles 'Dukie' Ermolenko who also rode in the United Kingdom.

Early career 
After originally showing an interest in motocross, Ermolenko began riding in the Californian speedway circuit. As he wore red leathers, former World Champion Barry Briggs suggested the nickname of "The mad Russian" (Due to Sam's family roots) although it is believed this is not something Sam himself was keen on.

Coming to Europe 
After some liberal success in California, Ermolenko moved over to the UK to race for the Poole Pirates for the 1983 British League season. He soon become a big hit with fans in Dorset and was welcomed back in 1984.
In 1985, he could not agree a deal to return to the UK so raced back home in California. He did however qualify for the World Final at Bradford's Odsal Stadium and came within a whisker of winning the World Title, narrowly losing out after a run-off with Danish duo Hans Nielsen and (eventual winner) Erik Gundersen. Ermolenko also rode for Västervik in the Swedish elite league 1992-1998. He was top scorer for Västervik all 7 seasons.

Wolverhampton Wolves 
In 1986 (and until 1995) Ermolenko returned to the UK to ride for the Wolverhampton Wolves in the British League. It was at Wolves that he established himself as a genuine World Class rider.

He rode for Sheffield Tigers in 1996, Belle Vue Aces 1997 before returning to Wolverhampton in 1998. In 1999 he helped Hull Vikings in their short stint in the top league before returning to Wolves in 2000 and 2001. In 2002 he had another spell at Belle Vue and at the age of 42 he again rejoined parent club Wolverhampton for the 2003 and 2004 season before spending his final season at Peterborough Panthers in 2005.

He was trainer/manager of Reading Bulldogs in 2006 and was involved in the bid to get Leicester Lions back in the sport for the 2011 season.

Ermolenko is the regular face of Sky Sports speedway coverage, doing both league and GP meetings.

He finished third in the World again in 1987 in Amsterdam (the first & only year when there was a two-day world final - Sam was leading after day one) and fourth in 1988 World Final in Vojens, Denmark. Many tipped Sam for World title honours in 1989, however a horrific injury whilst racing long track meant that he would sit out the 1989 & 1990 world title races.

Ermolenko did however lead the USA victory in the World team cup in 1990.
Bad luck and injury meant he missed out on individual world honours in 1991 & 1992. However he Captained Wolves to the British League title and was crowned British League Riders Champion in 1991 & won both the World Pairs & World Team cup as USA captain in 1992.

World Title year 
The 1993 season was supposed to see the last of the 'one off' world finals before the Grand Prix was introduced (this was not the case and the GP system did not begin until 1995) Ermolenko was again one of the pre-season favourites. At the world final in Pocking, Germany, Sam had a fantastic start to the meeting winning his first three rides. In Heat 15 he met fellow title contender and three time World Champion Hans Nielsen. In the first staging of the race, Nielsen was adjudged to have knocked Ermolenko off his machine and was excluded. In the re-run Ermolenko shed a chain entering the first bend, however fellow American Billy Hamill ran into the back of him and the referee controversially ordered a re-run with the three remaining riders. Ermolenko won the third staging of the race and after gaining an unbeaten 12 points from his 4 rides, he could afford the luxury of coming last in his final outing and still be crowned World Champion. 
After his World final triumph, he again led the USA to Pairs and Team cup glory. At the latter, he beat his old enemy Nielsen in a last heat decider on the Dane's home Coventry circuit. He was also unbeaten as the USA whitewashed England in a 3 match Test Series.
It also looked as though he would again lead Wolves to league title triumph however a broken leg put an abrupt end to his season and this combined with injuries to other key members of the side, meant Wolves narrowly missed out on winning the league to the Belle Vue Aces.

Defending Champion 
The 1994 season started late for Ermolenko as he recovered from the previous season's injuries. He did again qualify for the World Final (in Vojens) winning the Overseas title en route. However luck again deserted him and after a controversial exclusion in his opening ride, he scored only 6 points to finish way down the field. The season did finish on a high note though, as he led Wolves to a respectable third-place finish in the league and won the British League riders Championship again.

Grand Prix & later years 
1995 saw the inaugural Grand Prix season. Ermolenko started his first Grand Prix campaign slowly but after a stronger finish to the season, he finished third in the World. 1996 was his second and final year in the GP series, finishing 1 place below automatic qualifying place for the next years series. He did though once again win the British League Riders Championship in 1996, this time representing Sheffield Tigers. He did attempt to qualify back into the GP's in future years but unfortunately never made it. He did however continue to figure prominently in the British league.

A frequent and popular visitor to Australia during his career where he often joined track commentators for meetings that he was unable to ride in because of injury, Ermolenko finished third in the inaugural Australian Masters Series in 1995 behind Tony Rickardsson (1st) and Simon Wigg (2nd). He improved to 2nd in 1996 behind reigning Australian Champion Craig Boyce. He did not race in the 1997 series and raced a limited schedule to finish 7th in 1998.

Already a three-time winner of the Speedway World Team Cup (1990, 1992 and 1993), Ermolenko would win his fourth title with the USA in 1998. This would be the 6th and final World Championship of his career.

In 2000, he won the Overseas Final. The final big win of his career came when he won the Scottish Open Championship in 2003 at the Armadale Stadium. He joined other Americans such as Wilbur Lamoreaux (1939), Greg Hancock (1991 and 1992) and Bobby Ott (1995) as a winner of the event. As of 2014 no other American has won the Scottish Open.

Ermolenko retired in after the 2005 season where he rode or the Peterborough Panthers. In 2006 he staged a Farewell meeting at Wolverhampton's Monmore Green stadium.

World Final Appearances

Individual World Championship
 1985 -  Bradford, Odsal Stadium - 3rd - 13+1pts
 1986 -  Chorzów, Silesian Stadium - 7th - 9pts
 1987 -  Amsterdam, Olympic Stadium - 3rd - 24+2pts
 1988 -  Vojens, Speedway Center - 4th - 12pts
 1991 -  Gothenburg, Ullevi - 7th - 9pts
 1992 -  Wrocław, Olympic Stadium - 8th - 7pts
 1993 -  Pocking, Rottalstadion - Winner - 12pts
 1994 -  Vojens, Speedway Center - 13th - 6pts

World Pairs Championship
 1986 -  Pocking, Rottalstadion (with Kelly Moran) - 2nd - 46+4pts (23)
 1987 -  Pardubice, Svítkov Stadion (with Kelly Moran) - 3rd - 36pts (18)
 1988 -  Bradford, Odsal Stadium (with Shawn Moran) - 3rd - 39pts (16)
 1992 -  Lonigo, Pista Speedway (with Greg Hancock / Ronnie Correy) - Winner - 23+3pts (9)
 1993 -  Vojens, Speedway Center (with Ronnie Correy / Greg Hancock) - 2nd - 23pts (9)

World Team Cup
 1985 -  Long Beach, Veterans Memorial Stadium (with Shawn Moran / Bobby Schwartz / John Cook / Lance King) – 2nd – 35pts (3)
 1986 -  Göteborg, Ullevi,  Vojens, Speedway Center,  Bradford, Odsal Stadium (with Bobby Schwartz / Shawn Moran / Lance King / Rick Miller)  - 2nd - 76pts (22)
 1987 -  Fredericia, Fredericia Speedway,  Coventry, Brandon Stadium (with Shawn Moran / Lance King / Rick Miller / Kelly Moran) - 3rd - 93pts (20)
 1988 -  Long Beach, Veterans Memorial Stadium (with Lance King / Shawn Moran / Kelly Moran / Rick Miller) - 2nd - 32pts (13)
 1990 -  Pardubice, Svítkov Stadion - Winner - 37pts (11)
 1991 -  Vojens, Speedway Center - 3rd - 28pts (9)
 1992 -  Kumla, Kumla Speedway - Winner - 39pts (10)
 1993 -  Coventry, Brandon Stadium - Winner - 40pts (13)
 1994 -  Brokstedt, Holsteinring Brokstedt - 5th - 17pts (12)
 1995 -  Bydgoszcz, Polonia Bydgoszcz Stadium - 3rd - 19pts (9)
 1998 -  Vojens, Speedway Center - Winner - 28pts (0 - Reserve)
 1999 -  Pardubice, Svítkov Stadion - 3rd - 29pts (16)
 2000 -  Coventry, Brandon Stadium - 3rd - 35pts (16)

Speedway Grand Prix results

World Longtrack Championship

One Day Finals
 1988 -  Scheeßel (11th) 13pts

Since retirement 
Sam worked for Sky Sports in the UK as a trackside reporter and occasionally inside the studio.
He also had a spell helping out the Reading Bulldogs off the track in 2006 when they finished runners-up in the Elite League.

He is now tuning engines for riders as well his Sky TV work and was the main well known name behind the rebirth of Leicester Speedway for 2011 but all that collapsed in September 2010 and has moved onto other projects and now nothing to do with the Leicester set up.

References

Works cited

1960 births
Living people
American speedway riders
Individual Speedway World Champions
Speedway World Pairs Champions
Polonia Bydgoszcz riders
Peterborough Panthers riders
Poole Pirates riders
Wolverhampton Wolves riders
Sheffield Tigers riders
Hull Vikings riders
American expatriate sportspeople in Poland
Expatriate speedway riders in Poland
People from Maywood, California
Individual Speedway Long Track World Championship riders